The Dolphin is a live album by saxophonist Stan Getz which was recorded at Keystone Korner and released on the Concord Jazz label in 1981.

Reception

The Allmusic review by Scott Yanow stated "Stan Getz's first recording for Concord finds him returning to the strictly acoustic straightahead format".

Track listing
 "The Dolphin" (Luiz Eça) - 9:49
 "A Time for Love" (Johnny Mandel, Paul Francis Webster) - 6:40
 "Joy Spring" (Clifford Brown) - 9:40
 "My Old Flame" (Sam Coslow, Arthur Johnston) - 6:36
 "The Night Has a Thousand Eyes" (Jerry Brainin, Buddy Bernier) - 8:24
 "Close Enough for Love" (Mandel, Paul Williams) - 7:07

Personnel 
Stan Getz - tenor saxophone
Lou Levy - piano
Monty Budwig - bass
Victor Lewis - drums

References 

1981 live albums
Stan Getz live albums
Concord Records live albums
Albums produced by Carl Jefferson
Albums recorded at Keystone Korner